Božo Musa (born 15 September 1988) is a Croatian professional footballer who plays as a defender for Bosnian Premier League club Široki Brijeg.

Club career
A native of Široki Brijeg, Musa went through all the ranks of the NK Široki Brijeg academy, even featuring once for his youth national team, but started his career at the Croatian 3. HNL club Zmaj Makarska. He went on to feature in a series of lower-tier clubs, along with very brief stints at top-tier Sesvete and RNK Split.

In 2012, he returned to Bosnia and Herzegovina, playing a season for second-tier club Branitelj in Mostar, but moved back to Croatia the following season, signing for 2. HNL side NK Zagreb. Attaining promotion with the club, he remained in Zagreb playing in the 1. HNL until he annulled his contract due to unpaid wages in the summer of 2015. Musa signed with Slaven Belupo in early 2016. On 3 January 2019, he joined Polish club Miedź Legnica.

On 8 February 2021, Musa signed a two-and-a-half year contract with his boyhood club Široki Brijeg, playing in the Bosnian Premier League. He made his official debut for the club on 28 February 2021, in a league game against Mladost Doboj Kakanj.

References

External links

1988 births
Living people
People from Široki Brijeg
Association football defenders
Croatian footballers
HNK Zmaj Makarska players
NK Croatia Sesvete players
NK Neretva players
NK Vrapče players
RNK Split players
NK Zagreb players
NK Slaven Belupo players
Miedź Legnica players
NK Široki Brijeg players
Croatian Football League players
First Football League (Croatia) players
First League of the Federation of Bosnia and Herzegovina players
Ekstraklasa players
I liga players
Premier League of Bosnia and Herzegovina players
Croatian expatriate footballers
Expatriate footballers in Poland
Croatian expatriate sportspeople in Poland
Expatriate footballers in Bosnia and Herzegovina
Croatian expatriate sportspeople in Bosnia and Herzegovina